The Mannie Formation is a geologic formation in Tennessee. It preserves fossils dating back to the Ordovician period.

See also

 List of fossiliferous stratigraphic units in Tennessee
 Paleontology in Tennessee

References
 

Ordovician geology of Tennessee
Ordovician southern paleotemperate deposits